Bigg Boss is the first season of the Indian reality TV programme Bigg Boss. It aired on Sony Entertainment Television from 3 November 2006 to 26 January 2007, a total of 86 days. Unlike other versions of Big Brother, the Indian version uses celebrities as housemates, not members of the general public. It was hosted by Bollywood actor Arshad Warsi. The series ended on 26 January 2007 with Rahul Roy becoming the winner while Carol Gracias became the runner-up.

Rakhi Sawant returned in Bigg Boss 14 and Bigg Boss 15 while Kashmera Shah returned in Bigg Boss 14.

Production 
The show is based on the Big Brother format developed by John de Mol. A number of contestants (known as "housemates") lived in a purpose-built house and were isolated from the rest of the world. Each week, housemates nominated two of their peers for eviction, and the housemates who received the most nominations would face a public vote. Of these, one would eventually leave, having been "evicted" from the House. However, there were exceptions to this process as dictated by Bigg Boss. In the final week, there were three housemates remaining, and the public voted for who they wanted to win.

Tasks were set by Bigg Boss each week. The housemates were allowed to gamble on task outcomes and were rewarded with extra money to order more supplies if they won.

Housemates Status

Housemates
The participants in the order of appearance and entered in house are:
Rahul Roy – Former actor. He is known for his role in the film Aashiqui.
Carol Gracias – Supermodel. She is a past winner of the coveted India's L'Oréal/Elite Look of the Year title. She gained much publicity after a wardrobe malfunction. She has also been a part of films like Bluffmaster!.
Ravi Kishan – Superstar of Bhojpuri cinema and Indian Politician (later). He is known for appearing in various Bollywood and Bhojpuri films. His acting in the film Tere Naam made him a well known celebrity.
Rakhi Sawant – Actress. Always in news for various controversies. She appeared in films like Chura Liyaa Hai Tumne, Main Hoon Na and Masti.
Amit Sadh – Actor. He participated in the dance reality show Nach Baliye with ex Neeru Bajwa. He has acted in shows like Kyun Hota Hai Pyarrr & Saaksshi.
Rupali Ganguly – Indian television actor. She is well known for her roles in Sarabhai vs Sarabhai, Bhabhi, Sanjivani, Kkavyanjali, Baa Bahoo Aur Baby and Kahaani Ghar Ghar Kii. Also popularly seen as Anupama.
Ragini Shetty– Commoner. 
Anupama Verma – Model and actress.
Aryan Vaid – Actor and Model.
Kashmera Shah – Former Bollywood actress and reality television star.
Deepak Parashar – Television and film actor.
Bobby Darling – Actress. She gained much popularity after her gender reassignment surgery.
Salil Ankola – Cricketer and actor.

Wild Card Entrants
Deepak Tijori – Bollywood actor popular for playing different roles.
Baba Sehgal – Singer and Rapper.

Main events 
On Day 1, Bigg Boss set Ragini Shetty a secret mission. She must pretend to be a celebrity in the Bigg Boss House. If she was successful she would be a full housemate, if she failed she would be evicted. She passed the task and was allowed to live in the Bigg Boss House as a housemate.

On Day 7, Salil was ordered by the Bombay High Court to leave the house or face criminal charges, in accordance with an agreement he had signed previously to refrain from participating or acting in television shows made by other production houses that “directly or indirectly compete with Balaji Telefilms”. He was ordered to leave by Bigg Boss the next day after Endemol India had received a court order. Prior to his forced eviction, he suggested the contract he signed with Balaji Telefilms could be potentially illegal. The decision was taken to replace him, and on Day 14 Deepak Tijori was revealed to be his replacement.

After being evicted in the fourth week, Rakhi Sawan later re-entered the house, bringing with her gifts for the other housemates that were supposedly from their families. This stirred up controversy among contestants, with some finding it hard to believe her story. For instance, Amit did not believe the card that Rakhi gave him was from his girlfriend.

On Day 48, Baba Sehgal entered the house as another new contestant.

Kashmera was later brought back, and was set a task to make her presence felt in the house, without coming face to face with the other housemates or directly telling them. She left clues to let the housemates know that someone else was living in the house. After her presence was revealed, she informed everyone of the comments which Rakhi had made about them, leading the housemates to confront and alienate her.

After 12 weeks, Rahul emerged as the winner of Bigg Boss on Day 86. Carol left as the first runner up, whilst Ravi was the second runner up.

Nominations table

 Ravi was automatically put up for eviction by Bigg Boss for swearing and for refusing to wear a microphone.
 Rahul was the Sarpanch and only allowed to have 1 nomination this week.
 Bigg Boss called for open nominations and Rakhi was exempted from the nominations for winning a task.

References

2006 Indian television seasons
2007 Indian television seasons
01